Cát Đằng station is a railway station on North–South railway at Km 108 in Vietnam. It's located in Ý Yên, Nam Định between Núi Gôi station and Ninh Bình station.

References 

Railway stations in Vietnam